Genji, LLC., a subsidiary of Peace Dining Corporation, is the largest sushi provider to Whole Foods Market, serving the eastern U.S., California and the UK. Headquartered in Philadelphia, Pennsylvania, the company currently operates over 165 sushi and Japanese cuisine restaurants in 18 U.S. states and D.C., and in London and Scotland. Ingredients are all-natural with no artificial preservatives, flavor-enhancers or food coloring. Fish is sourced from suppliers who use sustainable fishing practices which do not deplete the fish population.
Genji employs approximately 900 sushi chefs throughout all of its stores, making it one of the largest independently operated (non-franchise-based) sushi companies in the U.S.  The current product mix includes daily prepared sushi, as well as various side dishes.  The company also operates several Asian Cuisine venues under the Kamado Kitchen moniker.

Origins 
Genji began as a mom-and-pop restaurant located in Philadelphia, Pennsylvania, serving sushi and Japanese cuisine. In the late 1990s, Whole Foods Market invited Genji to be their sushi provider at several stores in the Mid-Atlantic region. Building on this successful partnership, Genji expanded into new locations throughout the Eastern States. In 1997, Peace Dining Corporation bought the company as part of its goal to contribute to healthy eating habits on a global scale. Currently, the company operates over 165 stores in the US and in the United Kingdom.

Brands 
The principal "Genji" logo is used within Whole Foods Market. The circle is a variant of a letter "G" and represents bringing people together, well-being, and commitment to health.  At the center of the circle, the dot or "head" represents a precious jewel while the "legs" and "arms" symbolize water and purity.  Combined, the logo conveys the companies focus on organic, all-natural, and sustainable qualities.

Management 
The CEO and president of Genji, LLC. is Josh Onishi.  The chairman is Masaki Kuboi (also president of Peace Dining Corporation).

Hana Group 
Peace Dining Corporation was acquired by Hana Group, headed by Josh Onishi. Hana Group was founded in 2012 and has various brands which sell food. Early investors included TA Associates, which exited and were replaced by Permira in 2019.

See also
 List of sushi restaurants

References 

Sushi restaurants in the United States
Privately held companies based in Pennsylvania